Lowell Blair Nesbitt (October 4, 1933 - July 8, 1993) was an American painter, draughtsman, printmaker, and sculptor. He served as the official artist for the NASA Apollo 9, and Apollo 13 space missions; in 1976 the United States Navy commissioned him to paint a  mural in the administration building on Treasure Island spanning 26 feet x 251 feet, then the largest mural in the United States; and in 1980 the United States Postal Service honored Lowell Nesbitt by issuing four postage stamps depicting his paintings.

Early years
Lowell Blair Nesbitt was born to parents, Frank E. Nesbitt, and Mildred C. Nesbitt (née Carback) in Towson, Maryland. He was raised in an affluent Towson neighborhood, the Stoneleigh Historic District at 708 Stoneleigh Road.

Nesbitt graduated from Towson High School in 1951; and earned a Bachelor of Fine Arts degree from the Tyler School of Art and Architecture at Temple University in Philadelphia, Pennsylvania in 1955. He also studied stained glass, and printmaking from 1955-1956 on a fellowship at the Royal College of Art in London, England.

Following his academic studies, Nesbitt enlisted in the United States Army from 1956-1958. Upon his return, he lived in Washington D.C. where he worked as a night watchman at The Phillips Collection until 1963 when he relocated permanently to New York City to be a career visual artist.

Career
In 1958 the Baltimore Museum of Art hosted the first solo museum exhibit that Nesbitt was to have in his lengthy career, but it was in 1964 with his debut at the Corcoran Gallery of Art (Museum) in Washington, D.C. that Nesbitt received greater recognition. The array of botanical works most likely would not have been created had it had not been for the beckoning of fellow artist Robert Indiana, who, in 1962, after viewing some of Lowell Nesbitt's abstract paintings drawings and prints, suggested that he attempt to make a conversion from the abstraction which Nesbitt’s career had been focused on pre-1962, to the style of realism.

Nesbitt was often classified as a Photorealist artist, though he fought inclusion with this group of artists throughout his career. Nesbitt established himself as an artist who could employ both diversity of technique and subject matter while creating paintings, drawings and prints using studio interiors, articles of clothing, piles of shoes, x-ray figures (Nesbitt was the first highly recognized artist to use this subject matter since the artists of the New Zealand region unknowingly painted "x-ray style" figures at the early portion of the last millennium), caverns, ruins, landscapes, flowers, groupings of fruits and vegetables, and electronic components (he is credited for being the first artist to use computer parts as subject matter for his artwork). He also used his pet dogs in addition to birds, reptiles, various mammals and the Neoclassical facades of SoHo's 19th century cast-iron buildings and several of Manhattan's major bridges, in addition to a number of series in which he incorporated numerous Victorian staircases, and other interior scenes as subject matter for his artwork. His last series in the 1980s, titled the “impossible series” was a grouping of surrealistic landscapes paintings and drawings.

To honor Nesbitt's contributions to the art world, in 1980, the United States Postal Service issued four stamps based on his floral paintings. He also served as the official artist for the NASA space flights of Apollo 9 and Apollo 13. Nesbitt was found dead in his New York studio in 1993 at the age of 59. Police stated he died of natural causes.

Studio and mansion
In 1976, Nesbitt had moved from his studio, an already large location on West 14th Street (which he shared with artist Ian Hornak in the middle portion of the 1960s) in New York, to 389 West 12th, Street, New York. Formerly the site of a police stable that he purchased and Edward F. Knowles redesigned. This studio and living space included an indoor swimming pool, a four-story atrium and a rooftop entertainment area; Nesbitt labelled the facility "The Old Stable." Nesbitt hired two full-time staff members, a caretaker for his plants and a chef. Nesbitt's studio became a popular gathering place for major art world figures, celebrities and dignitaries including; Andy Warhol, Roy Lichtenstein, Robert Indiana, Jasper Johns, Robert Motherwell, Larry Rivers, and James Rosenquist. This monumental space was featured in articles in the New York Times, the Washington Post and Architectural Digest Magazine in the late 1970s. After Nesbitt’s death the "Old Stable" was purchased by fashion designer Diane von Furstenberg, who used it for her primary design studio and inner-city living area. She continued to use the structure until the early 2000s, when it was sold to the real estate developer Barry Diller, her husband, and demolished to make space for a new high-rise building.

Robert Mapplethorpe scandal
In June 1989 Nesbitt became involved in the scandal surrounding fellow artist photographer Robert Mapplethorpe. The Corcoran Gallery of Art in Washington, D.C., had agreed to host a solo exhibit of Mapplethorpe's works without stipulating what type of subject matter would be used. Mapplethorpe decided to debut sexually suggestive photographs in Washington, D.C. The hierarchy of the Corcoran and even certain members of United States Congress were horrified when the works were revealed to them, and the museum refused to go ahead with the exhibit. As a longtime friend of Mapplethorpe, Nesbitt revealed that he had a $1.5 million bequest to the museum in his will. However, in public statements, Nesbitt promised that if the museum refused to host the exhibition of the controversial images created by Mapplethorpe he would revoke his bequest. The Corcoran refused and Nesbitt bequeathed the $1.5 million to the Phillips Collection, which he cited as an early inspiration to his career when he had worked there as a young man in the position of a night watchman.

Museum and government collections
Lowell Nesbitt’s artwork is owned by hundreds of public collections worldwide. Those collections include, American Embassy art program; The Art Institute of Chicago, Illinois; David Geffen Hall, Lincoln Center, New York, New York; Baltimore Museum of Art, Maryland; Butler Institute of American Art, Youngstown, Ohio; Castle Gandolfo, Rome, Collection of the Vatican Museums; Cleveland Museum of Art, Ohio; Corcoran Gallery of Art, Washington, D.C. (transferred to the National Gallery of Art, Washington D.C.); Dallas Museum of Art, Dallas, Texas; Detroit Institute of Arts, Detroit, Michigan; Ulrich Museum, Wichita State University, Kansas; United States Environmental Protection Agency, Washington, D.C.; Federal Reserve Bank, Baltimore, Maryland; Federal Reserve Bank of Richmond, Virginia; Harvard Art Museums, Harvard University, Cambridge, Mass; Modern Art Museum of Fort Worth, Texas; Goucher College, Baltimore, Maryland; High Museum of Art, Atlanta, Georgia; Hirshhorn Museum and Sculpture Garden, Smithsonian Institution, Washington, D.C.; Hunt Institute for Botanical Documentation, Canegie-Mellon University, Pittsburgh, Pennsylvania; International Monetary Fund, Washington, D.C.; Israel Museum, Jerusalem; John and Mable Ringling Museum of Art, Sarasota, Florida; Museum of Contemporary Art San Diego, La Jolla, California; Library of Congress, Washington, D.C.; Orlando Museum of Art, Florida; Massachusetts Institute of Technology, Boston; Memorial Art Gallery, University of Rochester, New York; Miami-Dade Public Library System, Miami, Florida; Milwaukee Art Museum, Wisconsin; Morris Museum of Art, Morristown, New Jersey; Museum of Modern Art, New York; National Aeronautics and Space Administration, Washington, D.C.; National Gallery of Art, Washington D.C.; American Art Museum, The Smithsonian Institution, Washington, D.C.; Te Papa, Wellington, New Zealand; New York City Center, New York; Oberlin College, Ohio; Oklahoma City Museum of Art, Tulsa; Parrish Art Museum, Southampton, New York; Ludwig Forum für Internationale Kunst, Germany; Philadelphia Museum of Art, Pennsylvania; The Phillips Collection, Washington, D.C.; Centre national des arts plastiques, Paris, France; Renwick Gallery, Smithsonian Institution, Washington D.C.; Saginaw Art Museum, Saginaw, Michigan; San Antonio Museum of Art, Texas; SEB Group, Goteborg, Sweden; Temple University, Philadelphia, Pennsylvania; Thyssen-Bornemisza Museum; Tucson Museum of Art, Arizona; Twelfth Naval District, Treasure Island Museum, San Francisco, CA; United States Department of the Interior, Washington, D.C.; University of Maryland, College Park, Maryland; University of North Texas, Denton, Texas; University of Virginia, Charlottesville; Washington and Lee University, Lexington, Virginia; Worcester Art Museum, Worcester, Massachusetts; and Yale University Art Gallery, Yale University, New Haven, CT.

Solo exhibitions
His solo exhibitions were held in the following galleries (partial listing)—
Baltimore Museum of Art, Baltimore, MD, 1958
Corcoran Gallery of Art: Washington D.C., 1964
Baltimore Museum of Art, Baltimore, MD, 1969
The Corcoran Gallery of Art, Washington, D.C., 1973
Museo de Bellas Artes, San Juan, PR, 1974
The Corcoran Gallery of Art, Washington, D.C., 1975
Memorial Art Gallery, University of Rochester, NY, 1975
Hayden, Massachusetts Institute of Technology, Cambridge, MA, 1976
Navy and Marine Corps Museum, Treasure Island, San Francisco, CA, 1976
Edwin A. Ulrich Museum of Art, Wichita KS, 1977
Kent State University, Kent, OH, 1978
Selby Botanical Gardens, Museum of Botany and the Arts, Sarasota, FL, 1979
Marion Koogler Mcnay Art Institute, San Antonio, TX, 1980
The Aldrich Museum of Contemporary Art, Ridgefield, CT, 1980
Butler Institute of American Art, Youngstown, OH, 1982
Atlantic Center for the Art, New Smyrna Beach, FL, 1983
Burpee Art Museum, Rockford, IL, 1983
Morris Museum of Arts and Sciences, Morristown, NJ, 1983
Oklahoma Art Center, Oklahoma City, OK, 1983
Washington and Lee University, Lexington, VA, 1983
Institute of Contemporary Art, University of Penn., 1983
Oklahoma Art Center, Oklahoma City, OK, 1984
Tyler Gallery, Tyler School of Art, Temple University, Philadelphia, PA, 1986
Tyler Gallery, Tyler School of Art, Temple University, Philadelphia, PA, 1989
Center for Cultural Arts, Gadsden, AL, 1989

Selected books and catalogues
Flowers Facades and IBM Machines, Howard Wise Gallery, New York, New York, September/October 1965. Text by Henry Martin.
Art 1965, New York Worlds Fair, New York, New York, 1965. Text by Brian O’Doherty, statement by artist.
Interior Spaces, Howard Wise Gallery, New York, New York, 1966. Text by Bill Wilson.
The Big Drawing, Graham Gallery, New York, New York, April/May 1969. Text by Barbara Kulicke.
Aspects of New Realism, Milwaukee Art Center, June/August 1969. Contemporary Arts Museum, Houston, September/October 1969; Akron Art Institute, November/December 1969. Text by John Lloyd Taylor.
The New Painting, Praeger, New York 1969. Text by Kultermann, Udo.
Lowell Nesbitt, Pyramid Gallery, Washington D.C.
Lowell Nesbitt, Gallery Ostergren, Malmo, Sweden, January/February 1972. Text by Anders Bergh.
Lowell Nesbitt, Gallery Fabian Carlson, Goteborg, Sweden, March/April 1972. Text by Anders Bergh.
Lowell Nesbitt, Gimpel and Hanover Gallery, Zurich, Switzerland, May/June 1972. Text by Udo Kultermann.
Lowell Nesbitt, Gallery Aronovitsch, Stockholm, Sweden, November 1972. Text by Anders Bergh.
Radical Realism, Praeger, New York, 1972. Text by Udo Kultermann.
Hyperrealiste Americain, Galerie Des Quatre Movements, Paris, France 1972.
Botanical Art and Illustration 1972-1973, The Hunt Institute for Botanical Documentation, Carnegie Mellon University, Pittsburgh, Pennsylvania 1972.
The Flowers Series 1964-1973, The Corcoran Gallery [Museum] of Art, Washington D.C., April/May 1973. Text by Henry T. Hopkins. Introduction by Roy Slade.
Hyperrealisme, Paris, France, 1973. Text by Isy Brachot.
Le Fleurs du Mal, Walton Galleries, San Francisco, California, June 1974. Text by John Pereault.
Lowell Nesbitt, Museo de Bellas Artes de Puerto Rico, October 1974. Text by Roy Slade.
Painting and Sculpture Today 1974, Contemporary Art Society of the Indianapolis Museum of Art, Indiana 1974.
Imagist Realism, Art Museum of the Palm Beach and the Norton Museum of Art, Palm Beach, Florida, December 1974/January 1975. Text by Richard Martin.
Tokyo International Biennale, "New Image in Painting," Tokyo, Japan 1974.
The Present Situation of American Art. Text by John Perrault.
Super Realism: A Critical Anthology, E.P. Dutton & Company, New York 1975. Text by Gregory Babcock.
Lowell Nesbitt: An Autobiography, ACG, New York, New York, January 1976. Text by Andrew Crispo.
American 1976: Bicentennial Exhibition, United States Department of the Interior, Washington D.C. 1976.
Artists Cookbook, Museum of Modern Art, New York, New York, December 1977.
Modedr med Kunstnere I Weekendavisen, Denmark 1977.
Lowell Nesbitt: Still Lifes, Andrew Crispo Gallery, New York, New York, March 1978. Text by Andrew Crispo.
Lowell Nesbitt, Art Contact, Miami, Florida 1978.
Sneakers, Workman Publishing Company, New York, New York 1978. Text by Samuel Americus Walker.
Lowell Nesbitt Flowers, 1964–1979, Andrew Crispo Gallery, New York, New York 1979. Text by Andrew Crispo.
The Bicycle, Museum Boymans-van Beuningen, Rotterdam, Belgium 1977.
Lowell Nesbitt: A Selection of Paintings and Drawings Since 1963. The Aldrich Museum of Contemporary Art, Ridgefield, Connecticut 1980. Text by Noel Frackman.
Nesbitt’s Nesbitt’s, Marion Koogler Mcnay Art Institute, San Antonio, Texas 1980.
New York Gallery Showcase, Oklahoma Art Center, Oklahoma City, 1981.
Lowell Nesbitt, General Electric Gallery, General Electric Corporate Headquarters, Fairfield, Connecticut.
Lowell Nesbitt - Works 1964-1971. Onnasch Gallery, Berlin, Germany 1982.
Lowell Nesbitt, Butler Institute of American Art, Youngstown, Ohio 1982.
Lowell Nesbitt: An American Realist 1962-1983, Oklahoma Art Center, Oklahoma City 1983. Text by Noel Frackman.
Reflections: New Conceptions of Nature, Hillwood Art Gallery, May/July 1984.
Art Collection of the American Embassy Vienna, Austria 1984.
Art Collection of the American Embassy Brussels, Belgium 1985.
American Realism: 20th Century Drawings and Watercolor, San Francisco Museum of Modern Art, November/September 1987.

References and sources
 
 Lowell Nesbitt Repository, Archives of American Art, Smithsonian Institution, Washington, D.C.
"Lowell Nesbitt, a Realist Painter Of Flowers, Is Found Dead at 59," New York Times, Roberta Smith, July 10, 1993
 “Corcoran Head Talks About Her Quitting,” New York Times, Susan F. Rasky, December 20, 1989
 “Artists Divided On Corcoran Apology,” New York Times, Barbara Gamarekian, September 20, 1989
 “'Tragedy of Errors' Engulfs the Corcoran,” New York Times, Barbara Gamarekian, September 18, 1989
, “Style; On the Day After, Some Eves to Remember,” New York Times, Enid Nemy, January 1, 1983
 “Art; Earth Sculpture Inspired by Indian Ceremonies,” New York Times, John Caldwell, November 22, 1981
 “ART A 'Disturbing' Show of Works by Nesbitt,” New York Times, John Caldwell, November 16, 198-0
 “The Kennedys (Well, Some of Them) Boost a Benefit,” New York Times, Anne-Marie Schiro, June 8, 1978
 “Home Beat; Tale of a Quilt Nesbitt at Bloomie's,” New York Times, Jane Geniesse, June 1, 1978
 “Art: Lowell Nesbitt Tends His Garden,” New York Times, Vivien Raynor, March 24, 1978
 “The Art World Turns to Original Prints as Tax Shelters; Other Uses Involved 'Form of Deferral' Little Cash Down Flood Called Possible Opinions Vary,” New York Times, Grace Glueck, February 5, 1978
 “Studio in a Stable; Studio in a Stable: A Pool and a Trapeze,” New York Times, Joan Kron, May 19, 1977
 “Drawings by Nesbitt, a Retrospective,” New York Times, Hilton Kramer, November 6, 1971
 “Lowell Nesbitt's Photographic Approach; Artist Pays Homage to Jack Mitchell,” New York Times, Hilton Kramer, March 14, 1970
 “Ian Hornak, 58, Whose Paintings Were Known for Hyper-Real Look,” New York Times, Ken Johnson, December 30, 2002
 Ian Hornak Repository, Archives of American Art, Smithsonian Institution, Washington, D.C.
, “Lowell Nesbitt,” Washington Post, July 10, 1993
 “Corcoran Cut From Painter's Will; Lowell Nesbitt's Mapplethorpe Protest,” Washington Post, Judd Tully, September 6, 1989
 “Into the Depths: Exploring the Grottoes and Flora of Lowell Nesbitt,” Washington Post, Meryle Secrest, March 22, 1975
 “Lowell Nesbitt's Flowers At the Corcoran Ball,” Washington Post, April 8, 1973
 “Ex-D.C. Artist Specializes in Photo-Like Studio Paintings,” Washington Post, Paul Richard Washington, October 1, 1967
, "Lowell Nesbitt (1933-1993): A Comprehensive Retrospective," Absolute Arts, September, 12th, 2003

1933 births
1993 deaths
20th-century American painters
American male painters
Artists from Baltimore
Painters from Maryland
Towson High School alumni
Temple University alumni
20th-century American sculptors
20th-century American male artists
American male sculptors
20th-century American printmakers
Sculptors from Maryland